The 2002 Crawley Borough Council election took place on 2 May 2002 to elect members of Crawley Borough Council in West Sussex, England. One third of the council was up for election and the Labour Party stayed in overall control of the council.

After the election, the composition of the council was:
Labour 23
Conservative 7
Liberal Democrats 2

Background
Before the election Labour controlled the council with 24 seats, compared to 5 for the Conservatives and 2 Liberal Democrats, with a further seat being vacant. 10 wards were contested, with 2 seats being elected in Pound Hill North.

Issues at the election included the growth of Crawley, parking, litter, street lights and a possible second runway at Gatwick Airport, with issues to do with the national Labour government also being raised.

Election result
Labour remained in control of the council with 23 councillors after holding 7 of the 11 seats contested, despite losing 1 seat to the Conservatives. The Conservative gain came in Furnace Green, where Brenda Blackwell defeated the former Labour mayor Ray Calcott by 1,269 votes to 895. This took to the Conservatives to 7 seats, as they also held the 2 seats contested in Pound Hill North, while the Liberal Democrats remained on 2 seats after holding Northgate.

The election had a trial of all postal voting in the 4 wards of Bewbush, Broadfield, Ifield and Southgate in an attempt to increase turnout. Overall turnout across Crawley was 30.09%, a rise from 23.2% at the 2000 election, and in the wards that trialed all postal voting, turnout increased by an average of 15.7%.

Ward results

References

2002 English local elections
2002
2000s in West Sussex